is an electoral district of the Japanese House of Representatives. The district was created in 1994 as part of the move to single-member districts that same year, and the district is currently represented by the Liberal Democratic Party's Seiji Kihara.

Areas Covered 
As of 13 January 2023, the areas covered by this district area as follows:

 Higashimurayama
 Higashiyamato
 Kiyose
 Higashikurume
 Musashimurayama

Since its creation in 1994, the borders of this district have so far not been changed.

Elected Representatives

Election Results 
‡ - Also ran in the Tokyo PR district

‡‡ - Also ran and won in the Tokyo PR district

References 

Musashimurayama, Tokyo
Higashikurume, Tokyo
Kiyose, Tokyo
Higashiyamato, Tokyo
Higashimurayama, Tokyo